Frances Newstead (born 7 May 1973) is an English road and track cyclist from Holmfirth, West Yorkshire.

Biography
Newstead took up cycling at Huddersfield University, where she studied sports science, commuting by bike before joining the university mountain bike club. She was spotted by coach Val Rushworth at Manchester velodrome while a riding the track league. She rode World Cup events in 2003 and 2004, and the  2002 UCI road world championships.

Newstead competed in the road race and time trial at the 2002 Commonwealth Games in Manchester, finishing eighth in both.

She has worked alongside Chris Boardman, she is also a coach and worked with British Cycling's Talent Team in 2005, 2006, 2007 and 2008.

Newstead has also been working with British Cycling's Paralympic team. In 2007, she helped Melaine Easter win the silver medal at the Pan American Championships, as tandem pilot in the road race.
Frances now has 7 kids and is living a happy life. She is married and no longer cycles, although she coaches.

Palmarès

2000
1st  British National Circuit Race Championships
1st  Points race, British National Track Championships
3rd Pursuit, British National Track Championships
1st Points race, Round 5, Ipoh, 2000 Track World Cup
2nd Pursuit, Round 5, Ipoh, 2000 Track World Cup 
2nd CTT Time Trial Championships, 10 Miles

2002
1st  British National Time Trial Championships
2nd CTT Time Trial Championships, 25 Miles
3rd Ster Zeeuwsche Eilanden
2nd Stage 3
7th Points race, Commonwealth Games
8th Road race, Commonwealth Games
8th Time trial, Commonwealth Games
12th Holland Ladies Tour

2003
2nd Pursuit, British National Track Championships
1st CTT Time Trial Championships, 25 Miles

2004
9th Profronde van Oostvoorne
10th Sparkassen Giro Bochum (UCI 1.9.2)
5th Climbs classification

2005
2nd Pursuit, British National Track Championships

References

External links

1973 births
Living people
English female cyclists
English track cyclists
People from Holmfirth
Cyclists from Yorkshire
Cyclists at the 2002 Commonwealth Games
Commonwealth Games competitors for England